NK Velebit is a Croatian football club based in the town of Benkovac.

Football clubs in Croatia
Football clubs in Zadar County
Association football clubs established in 1925
1925 establishments in Croatia